Portsmouth West was a borough constituency in the city of Portsmouth in Hampshire, England.  It returned one Member of Parliament (MP) to the House of Commons of the Parliament of the United Kingdom, elected by the first-past-the-post voting system.

History 

The constituency was created for the 1950 general election, and abolished for the February 1974 general election.

Boundaries
1950–1955: The County Borough of Portsmouth wards of Buckland, Charles Dickens, Fratton, Guildhall, Nelson, North End, Portsea, and St Mary.

1955–1974: The County Borough of Portsmouth wards of Buckland, Fratton, Nelson, North End, Portsea, and St Mary and Guildhall.

Members of Parliament

Election results

References

Parliamentary constituencies in Hampshire (historic)
Constituencies of the Parliament of the United Kingdom established in 1950
Constituencies of the Parliament of the United Kingdom disestablished in 1974
Politics of Portsmouth